A referendum on an electoral system for the Australian Capital Territory Legislative Assembly took place on 15 February 1992, alongside elections to the Legislative Assembly. Voters were asked to choose between the instant-runoff voting  in seventeen single-member electorates, and the single transferable vote in three multi-member electorates: two electing five members, and one electing seven. By a comfortable margin, voters chose the single transferable vote.

Results

References

Referendums in the Australian Capital Territory
1992 in Australia
1992 referendums
February 1992 events in Australia
1990s in the Australian Capital Territory